The 2010 UK Music Video Awards were held on 12 October 2010 at the Odeon West End in Leicester Square, London to recognise the best in music videos and music film making from United Kingdom and worldwide. The nominations were announced on 20 September 2010. American rock band OK Go won Video of the Year for "This Too Shall Pass (Rube Goldberg Machine vsn)" directed by James Frost, Synn Labs and OK Go.

Video of the Year

Icon Award

Video Genre Categories

Craft and Technical Categories

Individual and Company Categories

References

External links
Official website

UK Music Video Awards
UK Music Video Awards
UK Music Video Awards